A gubernatorial election was held on 7 April 2019 to elect the next governor of Fukui.

Candidates 
Issei Nishikawa* back by CDP, individuals LDP, DPFP.
Tatsuji Sugimoto, back by national LDP and NIK
Yukie Kanemoto, back by the JCP and SDP.

Results

References 

Gubernatorial elections in Japan
2019 elections in Japan
April 2019 events in Japan
Politics of Fukui Prefecture